Dicks Peak is a 9,974-foot-elevation (3,040 meter) mountain summit located in the Sierra Nevada mountain range in El Dorado County, California, United States. It is the third-highest peak in the Desolation Wilderness, and is set on land managed by Eldorado National Forest. One-half mile east of the peak the Pacific Crest Trail and Tahoe Rim Trail traverse Dicks Pass, which provides an approach option for those climbing the peak. Inclusion on the Sierra Peaks Section peakbagging list generates climbing interest.

Etymology
This mountain's name remembers Captain Dick Barter, known as the "Hermit of Emerald Bay". Fannette Island was Captain Dick's home from 1863 to 1873, and one night while rowing back to the island the retired sailor from England perished in a storm near Rubicon Point in 1873. This landform's toponym has been officially adopted by the U.S. Board on Geographic Names.

Climate
According to the Köppen climate classification system, Dicks Peak is located in an alpine climate zone. Most weather fronts originate in the Pacific Ocean, and travel east toward the Sierra Nevada mountains. As fronts approach, they are forced upward by the peaks (orographic lift), causing them to drop their moisture in the form of rain or snowfall onto the range. Precipitation runoff from the mountain ultimately drains to Lake Tahoe.

Gallery

See also
 
 Desolation Wilderness

References

External links
 Weather forecast: Dicks Peak
 Story of Captain Dick: Hermit's Ghost Haunts Emerald Bay

Eldorado National Forest
Mountains of El Dorado County, California
Mountains of the Desolation Wilderness
North American 3000 m summits
Mountains of Northern California
Sierra Nevada (United States)